Abaera aurofusalis is a species of snout moth in the genus Abaera. It was described by George Hampson in 1906 and is known from Brazil.

References

Moths described in 1906
Chrysauginae
Moths of South America